Urusovite is a rare copper aluminium arsenate mineral with formula: CuAlAsO5. It is a monoclinic-prismatic light green mineral.  

Its type locality and only reported occurrence is in the Novaya fumarole, Second scoria cone, North Breach, Great Fissure eruption, Tolbachik volcano, Kamchatka Oblast', Far-Eastern Region, Russia. It was named after Vadim Sergeevich Urusov, crystal chemist of Moscow State University. It was approved by the International Mineralogical Association in 1998.

References

Copper(II) minerals
Aluminium minerals
Arsenate minerals
Monoclinic minerals
Minerals in space group 14